Myers Hendrickson is an American football coach. He head football coach of Western Illinois University, a position he had held since December 17, 2021. Hendrickson served as the head football coach at Kansas Wesleyan University from 2019 to 2021.

Hendrickson joined Matt Drinkall's staff at Kansas Wesleyan in 2014 as quarterback and wide receiver coach. Hendrickson returned to Kansas Wesleyan in 2019 after Dinkall announced his resignation to join the staff at Army as an offensive quality control coach.

Hendrickson  is the son of Mark Hendrickson, who was the head football coach at Western Illinois from 2008 to 2012.

Head coaching record

References

External links
 Western Illinois player profile

Year of birth missing (living people)
Living people
American football wide receivers
Auburn Tigers football coaches
Coe Kohawks football coaches
Kansas Wesleyan Coyotes football coaches
Northern State Wolves football coaches
Western Illinois Leathernecks football players
Junior college football coaches in the United States